The Luika barb (Enteromius luikae) is a species of cyprinid fish.

It is found in Burundi and Tanzania.
Its natural habitats are rivers and intermittent freshwater lakes.
It is not considered a threatened species by the IUCN.

References

Enteromius
Cyprinid fish of Africa
Fish described in 1939
Taxa named by Kate Bertram
Taxonomy articles created by Polbot